The 2012 WNBL Finals was the postseason tournament of the WNBL's 2011–12 season. The Bulleen Boomers were the defending champions but were defeated in the Grand Final by the Dandenong Rangers.

Standings

Bracket
<onlyinclude>

Elimination final

(4) Townsville Fire  vs. (5) Sydney Uni Flames

Semi-finals

(1) Adelaide Lightning  vs. (2) Bulleen Boomers

(3) Dandenong Rangers  vs. (4) Townsville Fire

Preliminary final

(1) Adelaide Lightning vs. (3) Dandenong Rangers

Grand Final

(2) Bulleen Boomers vs. (3) Dandenong Rangers

Rosters

References 

Finals
Women's National Basketball League Finals
2012 Finals